The failure or fracture of a product or component as a result of a single event is known as mechanical overload. It is a common failure mode. The terms are used in forensic engineering and structural engineering when analysing product failure. Failure may occur because either the product is weaker than expected owing to a stress concentration, or the applied load is greater than expected and exceeds the normal tensile strength, shear strength or compressive strength of the product.

See also
 Forensic engineering
 Stress analysis
 Structural engineering

References

 Strength of Materials, 3rd edition, Krieger Publishing Company, 1976, by Timoshenko S.,
 Forensic Materials Engineering: Case Studies by Peter Rhys Lewis, Colin Gagg, Ken Reynolds, CRC Press (2004).

Engineering failures
Reliability engineering